Penza planetarium is located at Penza Central Park of Culture and Restore after Belinsky  in the building formerly occupied by the Penza Hydrometeorological station. Historical and cultural memorial of local importance. The first planetarium device was installed in 1954.

The planetarium is currently closed and under threat of demolition.

History 

Astronomy and meteorology research in Penza was started in 1855 when Ilya Ulyanov, physics and mathematics teacher of Penza noble institution, started to conduct systematic observations of the Earth atmosphere at the request of the Kazan University rector Nikolai Lobachevsky.

In 1928, the People's Observatory was built at the park as a memorial to Ilya Ulyanov. Now the wooden building of observatory is a historical and cultural monument of local importance.

Creating planetarium 

The first unit for Planetarium was established in 1954. In 1975, a better German machine "Small Zeiss" was installed to demonstrate a star sky at any time.

Penza Planetarium has a rich methodological base and a set of exhibits, demonstrated at the five halls of the museum.  The original meteorites, Ulugh Beg's Quadrant, Foucault pendulum can be seen at the exhibition .  The models of first artificial satellite of the Earth and orbital stations "Salyut 1" and "Mir» are in the Space Hall .

References

Planetaria in Russia
Penza
Buildings and structures in Penza Oblast
Objects of cultural heritage of Russia of regional significance
Cultural heritage monuments in Penza Oblast